Quest for a Throne (original title: Alla conquista di un impero) is an exotic adventure novel written by Italian author Emilio Salgari, published in 1907. It features his most famous character, Sandokan.

Plot introduction

Sandokan and Yanez De Gomera travel to Assam to restore Surama to the throne of her ancestors. Aided by Tremal-Naik, Kammamuri and the Tigers of Mompracem, the Portuguese devises an ingenious plan to take the capital. However, all does not go as easily as planned for an expected adversary thwarts their every move: Teotokris, the rajah’s favourite courtier, and a deadlier foe than any they have faced before.

Sources 
Emilio Salgari was an avid researcher and spent months reading and researching his exotic tales. The sources he used to pen this adventure include India and its Native Princes. Travels in Central India and in the Presidencies of Bombay and Bengal by Louis Rousselet, and Hindu Manners, Customs and Ceremonies by the Abbe Jean-Antoine Dubois.

See also

Novels in the Sandokan Series:
The Mystery of the Black Jungle
The Tigers of Mompracem
The Pirates of Malaysia
The Two Tigers
The King of the Sea

Novels in The Black Corsair series 
The Black Corsair
The Queen of the Caribbean
Son of the Red Corsair

External links
Read the first chapter.
Read about the series.
Read a review at Pirates and Privateers.
Read a Sandokan Biography.
Read about the historical Sandokan.
Italy’s enduring love affair with Emilio Salgari, The Economist, June 2017

Novels by Emilio Salgari
1907 novels
Italian adventure novels
20th-century Italian novels